Zabierzów  is a village in southern Poland in the Kraków metropolitan area, and situated (since 1999) in Lesser Poland Voivodship, previously (1975-1998) in Kraków Voivodship. 
Religions: Roman Catholicism (The Church) and Jehovah's Witnesses.

External links
Zabierzów official page

Villages in Kraków County